Cameron R. Hume (born 1947) is a career diplomat who has served as United States Ambassador to Algeria (1997-2000), South Africa (2001-2004), and Indonesia (2007–2010).

Career
Hume is a member of the United States Foreign Service, rank of Career Minister. His earlier assignments included Italy, Tunisia, Syria, Lebanon, the United Nations, and the Holy See.

More recently he has served as Ambassador to Algeria and to South Africa, and as Chargé d'Affaires to Sudan. 
While Ambassador to Indonesia, he focused on oceans, climate change, and education as elements of "soft power" diplomacy.

He has published three books (The United Nations, Iran and Iraq: How Peacemaking Changed (1994), Ending Mozambique's War (1994) and Mission to Algiers: Diplomacy by Engagement (2006)) and numerous articles on foreign policy. He has also been a fellow or guest scholar at the Council on Foreign Relations, Harvard University's Center for International Affairs, and the United States Institute of Peace. He is a lawyer and admitted to practice in New York and the District of Columbia.

His foreign languages include Arabic, French, and Italian.

Since leaving his post as ambassador in 2010, Hume has served as a consultant to various interests in Indonesia, including the Sinar Mas Group. His role with Sinar Mas sparked criticism from environmentalists, who blame Sinar Mas Group companies for deforestation in Indonesia. He brokered a settlement between Greenpeace and Sinar Mas' Golden Agri-Resources subsidiary in February 2011 that committed the company to less disruptive forestry practices.

References

External links
US State Department biography
United States Embassy in Jakarta

|-

|-

|-

1947 births
Ambassadors of the United States to Algeria
Ambassadors of the United States to Indonesia
Ambassadors of the United States to South Africa
American lawyers
Harvard University staff
Living people
Palm oil production in Indonesia
United States Foreign Service personnel
20th-century American diplomats
21st-century American diplomats